Stephen Preston (11 August 1905 – 30 June 1995) was an English cricketer active from 1928 to 1930 who played for Lancashire. He was born in Heywood and died in Blackpool. He appeared in five first-class matches as a righthanded batsman who bowled right arm medium pace. He scored 46 runs with a highest score of 33 and held one catch. He took six wickets with a best analysis of two for 42.

Notes

1905 births
1995 deaths
English cricketers
Lancashire cricketers